Beeches Farm is a farm and country house in the unparished area of Bexhill, Rother in East Sussex, England. A Grade II listed building, it dates to at least the 18th century, and is a two-storey building with stuccoed brickwork on the ground floor, and a hipped tiled roof.

References

Country houses in East Sussex
Grade II listed houses
Grade II listed buildings in East Sussex
Bexhill-on-Sea